12 String Guitar! is an instrumental folk album released by The Folkswingers in 1963. The Folkswingers were a studio band with constantly changing personnel but on this album, they are Glen Campbell on 12-string guitar and The Dillards.

Track listing

Critical reception

Personnel
Doug Dillard – banjo
Rodney Dillard – guitar
Dean Webb – bass
Glen Campbell – 12 string guitar

Production
Producer – Jim Dickson

Charts

References

External links
[ The Folkswingers] at Allmusic

Glen Campbell albums
1963 debut albums
The Dillards albums
World Pacific Records albums
Instrumental albums